A trustee is a legal term for a holder of property on behalf of a beneficiary.

Trustee or trusty may also refer to:

Stewardship 
 Board of trustees, a group of people who jointly supervise the activities of an organization
 Trustee-in-trust
 Trusty system (prison) (or "trustee system"), system of discipline and security in prisons
 Trusteeism, a Roman Catholic parish administration system

People 
 Trusty Gina, Swaziland politician
 Auston Trusty (born 1998), American soccer player
 Landon Trusty (born 1981), American football tight end
 Sharon Trusty (born 1945), American politician

Vehicles 
 SS Trusty, a steamship
 HMS Trusty
 Consolidated PT-1 Trusty, an airplane

Other uses 
 Trustee model of representation, a model for the role of representatives
 Trusty (band), an American punk band
 Trusty (dog), famous dog
 Trusty, a bloodhound in Lady and the Tramp
 Trusty Mountain, a summit located in Central New York
 Ubuntu 14.04 Trusty Tahr (or "Trusty"), code name for a release of the Ubuntu Linux

See also 
 Trustor (disambiguation)
 Trust (disambiguation)
 Trusteer, a portfolio of digital identity trust software products
 Trustee System (disambiguation)
 Trusteeship (disambiguation)